Unionport may refer to:

Unionport, Indiana, an unincorporated community in Randolph County
Unionport, Ohio, an unincorporated community in Jefferson County